Ladore is a ghost town in Neosho County, Kansas, United States. It was founded sometime between 1865 and 1867 twelve miles south of present-day Erie, Kansas and six miles north of Parsons, Kansas and is today a part of the Ladore Township Its founding is credited to J. N. Roach, W. C. Dickerson and S. Rosa who initially settled on the name Fort Roach until it was changed to Ladore in 1869.

According to an 1870 census the town had a population of 839 and had grown to 1,060 by the year 1880. In 1870 the Missouri–Kansas–Texas Railroad founded Parsons, Kansas which quickly grew into a railway hub. This resulted in many citizens moving to nearby Parsons and on March 15, 1901 the Ladore post office closed as a result of the dwindling population. Today the only remains of the town is the Ladore Cemetery that is a half mile east of Lake Parsons.

The town is most well known for the lynching of five outlaw men in May 1870 by a group of up to 300 people after they had robbed and beaten several members of the town.

References

Further reading
 "Ladore, KS Neosho County Lynching", The Guardian, May 26, 1870.

Ghost towns in Kansas
Geography of Neosho County, Kansas